The Minister of Foreign Affairs of the Russian Federation is a high-ranking Russian government official who heads the Ministry of Foreign Affairs of the Russian Federation. The foreign minister is one of the five presidential ministers, along with the ministers of defence, interior, emergencies and justice. Although they are members of the Cabinet, they are directly subordinate to the President.

The foreign minister, like other presidential ministers, is nominated and appointed by the President after consultation with the Federation Council (whereas non-presidential ministers are nominated by the Prime Minister and appointed by the President after approval by the State Duma). The foreign minister is also a permanent member of the Russian Security Council.

Tsardom of Russia

Russian Empire

Provisional Government

Russian SFSR (1917–1991)

Russian Federation (1991–present)

See also 
 Ministry of Foreign Affairs (Russia)
 List of Soviet foreign ministers
 Ministry of Foreign Affairs (Soviet Union)

References

External links 

 
 
 
Foreign
Foreign
Foreign Ministers
Russian
Foreign Ministers
1549 establishments in Russia
Russia